Elizabeth Lewisohn Eisenstein (October 11, 1923 – January 31, 2016) was an American historian of the French Revolution and early 19th-century France. She is well known for her work on the history of early printing, writing on the transition in media between the era of 'manuscript culture' and that of 'print culture', as well as the role of the printing press in effecting broad cultural change in Western civilization.

Career
Eisenstein was educated at Vassar College where she received her B.A., then went on to Radcliffe College for her M.A. and Ph.D. It was there she studied under Crane Brinton.  She reported that in the early 1950s she was not able to find a position in a university history department, not even part-time work. In 1957, after she had obtained her PhD, she and her husband moved to Washington, D.C. where she applied to multiple institutions for teaching positions, including Georgetown, George Washington University, Howard, and the University of Maryland. She eventually found a part-time position at American University.

She taught as an adjunct professor at American University from 1959 to 1974, then the University of Michigan, where she was the Alice Freeman Palmer Professor of History.  In 1979 she was resident consultant for the Center for the Book at the Library of Congress.

She held positions as a fellow at the Humanities Research Center of the Australian National University and at the Center for Advanced Study in the Behavioral Sciences (Palo Alto). Eisenstein was visiting professor at Wolfson College, Oxford, and published her lectures from that period as Grub Street Abroad. She was professor emerita at the University of Michigan and an honorary fellow of St Cross College, Oxford.

Her last work was Divine Art, Infernal Machine, the Reception of Printing in the West (Penn Press, 2011).

Family and personal life
Eisenstein is the third daughter of Sam A. Lewisohn, son of Adolph Lewisohn and Margaret Seligman, granddaughter of Joseph Seligman and Babet Steinhardt.

She married Julian Calvert Eisenstein in 1948. They had 4 children - one who died at birth in 1949 and another who died suddenly from a cerebral hemorrhage in 1974. Her husband passed away three months after her death. They were survived by two children, three grandchildren and two great-grandchildren.

From the age of 50, Eisenstein began competing in senior tennis tournaments, becoming well-known and winning three national grand slams between 2003-2005.

The Printing Press as an Agent of Change

Eisenstein's best-known work is The Printing Press as an Agent of Change, a two-volume, 750-page exploration of the effects of movable type printing on the literate elite of post-Gutenberg Western Europe.  In this work she focuses on the printing press's functions of dissemination, standardization, and preservation and the way these functions aided the progress of the Protestant Reformation, the Renaissance, and the Scientific Revolution.  Eisenstein's work brought historical method, rigor, and clarity to earlier ideas of Marshall McLuhan and others, about the general social effects of such media transitions.

This work provoked debate in the academic community from the moment it was published and is still inspiring conversation and new research today.  Her work also influenced later thinking about the subsequent development of digital media. Her work on the transition from manuscript to print influenced thought about new transitions of print text to digital formats, including multimedia and new ideas about the definition of text.

Eisenstein’s book has also received sharp criticism.  Paul Needham, now Librarian at Princeton University’s Scheide Library, described it as "almost impossible to comprehend" and suffering "from more general flaws of historical method: an unconcern for exact chronology; a lack of historical context; an exclusive reliance of [sic] secondary writings, not always accurately absorbed, not always particularly relevant …"

The Unacknowledged Revolution

Eisenstein's book The Printing Press as an Agent of Change lays out her thoughts on the "Unacknowledged Revolution," her name for the revolution that occurred after the invention of print.  Print media allowed the general public to have access to books and knowledge that had not been available to them before; this led to the growth of public knowledge and individual thought.  The ability to formulate thought on one's own thoughts became reality with the popularity of the printing press.  Print also "standardized and preserved knowledge which had been much more fluid in the age of oral manuscript circulation"  Eisenstein recognizes this period of time to be very important in the development of human culture; however, she feels that it is often overlooked, thus, the 'unacknowledged revolution'.

Awards
Eisenstein has received various awards and recognitions, including fellowships from the John Simon Guggenheim Memorial Foundation, the National Endowment for the Humanities, and the Rockefeller Foundation.  In 2002, she received the American Historical Association's Award for Scholarly Distinction, and in 2004 the University of Michigan awarded her the honorary degree of Doctor of Humane Letters.

In 2012 she was awarded the Gutenberg Prize of the International Gutenberg Society and the City of Mainz

In 1993, the National Coalition of Independent Scholars created the Eisenstein Prize, which is awarded biannually to members of the organization who have produced work with an independent focus.

Selected bibliography
   Based on the Rosenbach lectures, March 2010.
   Includes a new afterword by the author.
  Series : Lyell lectures 1990-1991.
  Series : The Sixth Hanes lecture.
 
 
 "Some Conjectures about the Impact of Printing on Western Society and Thought: A Preliminary Report," The Journal of Modern History  Vol. 40, No. 1, March 1968

Further reading
 Briggs, Asa and Burke, Peter(2005) A Social History of the Media: from Gutenberg to the Internet(second Edition) Polity, Cambridge.
 Baron, Sabrina A., Eric N. Lindquist, & Eleanor F. Shevlin (eds), "Agent of Change: Print Culture Studies after Elizabeth L. Eisenstein" (2007)

See also
History of the book

References

1923 births
2016 deaths
American historians
American people of German-Jewish descent
Historians of the French Revolution
Historians of France
Jewish American historians
Theorists on Western civilization
Literacy and society theorists
American women historians
Vassar College alumni
University of Michigan faculty
Articles containing video clips
Historians of printing
Lewisohn family
Mass media theorists
Philosophers of technology
Radcliffe College alumni
21st-century American Jews
21st-century American women